Seele may refer to:

 Željne, Slovenia
 Seele GmbH, German engineering and construction company
 The fictional organization SEELE in the anime Neon Genesis Evangelion, led by Keel Lorentz
 Seele Vollerei, a character in Honkai Impact 3rd